Mohamed Sallam (born 5 December 1969) is a former footballer and current goalkeeping coach of Egypt national football team.

Club career
Sallam spent his professional career in the Egyptian Premier League with Al-Olympi.

International career
Mohamed Sallam was a member in Egypt team in 1992 Summer Olympics.

References

External links
 
 

1969 births
Living people
Egyptian footballers
Egypt international footballers
Egyptian football managers
Olympic footballers of Egypt
Footballers at the 1992 Summer Olympics
Sportspeople from Alexandria
Association football goalkeepers